Santo Bartolomeo Quadri (December 2, 1919 – October 17, 2008) was an Italian Prelate of Roman Catholic Church.

Biography
Quadri was born in Ossanesga, Italy and was ordained a priest on March 6, 1943. He was appointed Auxiliary bishop of the Pinerolo Diocese as well as Titular bishop of Villa Nova on March 17, 1964. Quadri was ordained bishop May 7, 1964. On February 10, 1973 he was appointed bishop of the Terni-Narni Diocese and he held this position until his appointment to the Diocese of Modena-Nonantola. He was appointed to the Archdiocese of Modena-Nonantola on May 31, 1983 until his retirement on April 12, 1996.

See also
Diocese of Pinerolo
Roman Catholic Archdiocese of Modena-Nonantola
Roman Catholic Diocese of Terni-Narni-Amelia

External links
Catholic-Hierarchy
Death Notice

1919 births
2008 deaths
20th-century Italian Roman Catholic bishops
Participants in the Second Vatican Council